William Clarence Moulton (October 15, 1873 – December 14, 1927) was an American politician who served as a member of the Massachusetts Senate, as well as a member of the Common Council, Board of Aldermen and Mayor of Pittsfield, Massachusetts.

See also
 1920 Massachusetts legislature
 1921–1922 Massachusetts legislature

Notes

1873 births
1927 deaths
Massachusetts city council members
Republican Party Massachusetts state senators
Mayors of Pittsfield, Massachusetts